Ali Barani (also Romanized as ‘Alī Bārānī) is a village in Qalkhani Rural District, Gahvareh District, Dalahu County, Kermanshah Province, Iran. At the 2006 census, its population was 223, in 41 families.

References 

Populated places in Dalahu County